Federico Ricca Rostagnol (born 1 December 1994) is a Uruguayan footballer who plays as a left-back for Belgian side OH Leuven. He can also play as a centre-back.

Club career

Danubio
Ricca was born in Tarariras, Colonia Department. He joined Danubio FC's youth set up in 2011, after starting  at Club Atlético Maracaná. On 18 August 2013, he made his first team debut in a 0–0 away draw against Cerro Largo FC.

Ricca scored his first professional goal on 15 February 2014, his team's second in a 2–1 home win against Liverpool FC. He finished his first professional season with 23 matches and three goals, as his side was crowned champions.

Ricca remained as a regular starter for Danubio in the following seasons, spending the whole 2014–15 season without being substituted. He also appeared as a starter for the side in both Copa Libertadores and Copa Sudamericana.

Málaga
On 1 February 2016, Ricca signed a four-and-a-half-year deal with La Liga side Málaga CF. He made his debut there later in the month, in a 1–1 away draw against Real Sociedad.

Rica scored his first goal abroad on 20 April 2016 with a last-minute equalizer in a 1–1 home draw against Rayo Vallecano.

Club Brugge
On 14 August 2019, Ricca joined Belgian First Division A club Club Brugge on a four year deal for a fee of €3 million.

OH Leuven
On 12 August 2022, Ricca moved to another Belgian club OH Leuven on a three-year contract.

International career
Ricca was named in Uruguay's senior squad for the 2018 FIFA World Cup qualifiers against Venezuela and Colombia in September 2016. He made his debut on 4 June 2017 in a 3–1 friendly loss against Ireland, coming on for Maxi Pereira in the 62nd minute of the game.

Honours

Club
Danubio
 Uruguayan Primera División: 2013–14

Club Brugge
 Belgian First Division A: 2019–20, 2020–21
 Belgian Super Cup: 2021

International
Uruguay U23
Pan American Games: 2015

References

External links

1994 births
Living people
People from Colonia Department
Uruguayan footballers
Uruguay international footballers
Uruguay youth international footballers
Association football defenders
Danubio F.C. players
Málaga CF players
Club Brugge KV players
Oud-Heverlee Leuven players
Uruguayan Primera División players
La Liga players
Belgian Pro League players
Uruguayan expatriate footballers
Uruguayan expatriate sportspeople in Spain
Expatriate footballers in Spain
Uruguayan expatriate sportspeople in Belgium
Expatriate footballers in Belgium
Pan American Games gold medalists for Uruguay
Footballers at the 2015 Pan American Games
Pan American Games medalists in football
Medalists at the 2015 Pan American Games